Chess.com is an internet chess server, news website and social networking website. The site has a freemium model in which some features are available for free, and others are available for accounts with subscriptions. Live online chess can be played against other users in daily, rapid, blitz or bullet time controls, with a number of chess variants also available. Chess versus a chess engine, computer analysis, chess puzzles and teaching resources are also offered.

One of the largest chess platforms in the world, with achieving the milestone of 100 million users on December 16, 2022, Chess.com has hosted online tournaments including Titled Tuesdays, the PRO Chess League, the Speed Chess Championships, PogChamps, Online Chess Olympiads and computer vs. computer events.

History

Founding 
The domain Chess.com was originally set up in 1995 by Aficionado, a company based in Berkeley, California, to sell a piece of chess tutoring software called "Chess Mentor". Then, in 2005, Internet entrepreneur Erik Allebest and partner Jarom ("Jay") Severson, who met as undergraduate students at Brigham Young University, bought the domain name and assembled a team of software developers, redeveloping the site as a chess portal. The site was then relaunched in 2007 with heavy campaigning and promotion on social media.

Two years later, Chess.com acquired a similar chess social networking site, chesspark.com. In October 2013, Chess.com acquired the Amsterdam-based chess news site chessvibes.com as well. This news site, founded and operated by Dutch chess journalist Peter Doggers, continued to cover chess tournaments in a digital setting.

Growth in the 2010s 
The website reached a milestone in 2014, when it announced that over a billion live games had been played on the site, including 100 million correspondence games.
In January 2016, Chess.com announced a two-year overhaul of its previous interface (titled 'v3'). The site introduced new features including computer analysis of games, and the chess variants of crazyhouse, three-check chess, king of the hill, chess960 and bughouse.
Chess.com reached another milestone in June 2017, as the 2,147,483,647th (= 231-1) game was played, which caused the iOS app to stop working for those with 32-bit Apple devices. This occurred because of an integer overflow problem whereby the number was too large to be represented in the number of storage bits that were used.

Acquisition of Komodo 
In May 2018, Chess.com acquired the 3300+ Elo-rated commercial chess engine Komodo, which ranked 3rd behind Stockfish and Houdini at the time of acquisition. In conjunction, the Komodo team announced the addition of the probabilistic method of Monte Carlo tree search machine learning, the same methods used by the recent chess projects AlphaZero and Leela Chess Zero.

Recent history 
In November 2020, Chess.com acquired the rights to broadcast the World Chess Championship 2021, which is broadcast on live streaming platform Twitch.

Response to the Russian invasion of Ukraine 
In response to the Russia-Ukraine crisis of 2022, Chess.com published two articles that were critical of the 2022 Russian invasion of Ukraine, and replaced Russian flags with a link to these articles. In retaliation, Chess.com was blocked in Russia. The site blocked Sergey Karjakin, Russian (formerly Ukrainian) grandmaster, over his support for the invasion, and Karjakin in turn supported Russia's block of the website.

Chess cheating controversy 
In September 2022, Chess.com was caught in the furor of a controversy regarding cheating in professional chess games. A controversy erupted with accusations by grandmaster Magnus Carlsen against Hans Niemann. Leaked emails revealed that some people cheated on the Chess.com platform in games involving prize money and that Chess.com removed some players' accounts, including grandmaster Maxim Dlugy, who had been found to be cheating.

Chess.com Global Championship 
In November 2022, The Chess.com Global Championship was inaugurated with a $1,000,000 prize pool. 8 players that advanced from the CGC Knockout competed for a $500,000 total prize fund and Global Champion title in the finals taking place in Toronto, Canada. Wesley So became the first Chess.com Global Champion, defeating Nihal Sarin in the finals with a match score of 4.5-1.5.

Other 
In its latest record, Chess.com is announced it had over 100,000,000 members in December 2022.

In January 2023, Chess.com added in five new "cat" chessbots, including Mittens. These bots were later removed and replaced by AI bots in February 2023.

Recently, due to the surge in popularity of Chess, their databases have been crashing.

Features 
Chess.com operates a freemium business model: main site features are free but others are limited or unavailable in some respects until a  subscription is paid.

Subscriptions 
Chess.com as a freemium model has three different subscriptions, each offering more usage of the services they provide. The subscriptions can be billed monthly or annually. The three subscriptions are Gold, Platinum and Diamond, each varying in prices and services offered.

Gameplay

Time Controls and Daily Chess 
Users can play in many different time controls which are grouped into Rapid, Blitz, Bullet, and Daily (correspondence chess).

Variants 
Users can play a number of popular chess variants on the live server, including crazyhouse, three-check, four-player, King of the Hill, chess960, atomic, Racing Kings, Duck Chess and bughouse.

Vote Chess 
Vote chess is played between two teams of players on Chess.com. The players vote on the next move and the highest voted move is played. It follows a daily time control and the players are allowed to see the votes of other players too.

Computer 
Chess.com allows the player to play against a computer. Along with a standard computer, there are many other computers representing popular streamers and world-class chess players. One such engine was Mittens, which became popular in early 2023.

Puzzles 
Chess.com has a database of manually created puzzles (Unlike game-extracted puzzles of Lichess). Currently, there are roughly 600,000 puzzles in their database. A player gets a rating based on their performance and speed in solving the puzzles. It also offers other special modes of puzzles such as puzzle rush and puzzle battle. Everyday, one puzzle is chosen as the Daily Puzzle which can be played directly from the Homepage.

Puzzle Rush 
Puzzle Rush is a special mode of puzzles in which the player has to solve as many puzzles as they can within the selected time. If the player solves 3 puzzles incorrectly, their rush finishes.

Puzzle Battle 
Puzzle Battle is another special mode of puzzles in which a player competes with another player to solve the most puzzles in the given time of 3 minutes. If a player solves 3 puzzles incorrectly, they cannot solve any more puzzles. The person who solves the most puzzles is the winner and the rating of the players change accordingly.

Lessons 
Chess.com has a unique feature of lessons. The lessons have videos which explain the topic and challenges which are like puzzles regarding the topic explained in the videos. Contributors can create lessons but some are created by the core chess.com team.

News 
Chess.com also has a news section in which reporters post reports of major chess tournaments around the world as well as the results of major chess.com tournaments such as the Speed Chess Championship.

Additional features include chess forums, articles, downloads, opening databases, teams, live broadcasts, online coaching and a game database of over 2 million games.

The company publishes a large number of articles on a variety of chess-related topics, including chess strategy, opening theory and history. Regular contributors include Gregory Serper, Bruce Pandolfini, Sam Shankland, Dan Heisman, Jeremy Silman, Simon Williams, Daniel Naroditsky, Natalia Pogonina and Daniel Rensch.

Chess.com has a policy against the use of chess engines in all forms of the game, except where "specifically permitted (such as a computer tournament)". It utilizes algorithms and statistical data to catch players using engines in games and bans many on a daily basis, and employs six moderators to prevent cheating.

Subsidiary companies

ChessKid.com 

Chess.com also runs the subsidiary site chesskid.com for chess players of all ages. ChessKid focuses on a child-friendly environment aimed towards chess improvement for beginners to club players. It also has a guardianship program in which parents and authorized coaches can overlook the child's progress over time, to see statistics about their progress in tactics or how many videos they watched so that they can give encouragement and tips on how to improve. ChessKid features no advertising.

ChessKid.com has run a yearly online championship called CONIC (the ChessKid Online National Invitational Championship), since 2012 which is recognized by the United States Chess Federation. According to David Petty, the event organizer in 2013,

ChessKid has made agreements and partnerships with chess associations to bring the educational benefit of chess to children in schools. In 2014, for a trial period, all signups to the ICA (Illinois Chess Association) included a free gold member subscription to ChessKid. They also have a long-term partnership with the NTCA (North Texas Chess Academy) which gives children access to online instructors.

Play Magnus Group 
In August 2022, the Play Magnus Group accepted an offer to be acquired by Chess.com at a value of 800 million kr (US$80 million). The Play Magnus Group owns brands and businesses including the chess server chess24, the mobile app Play Magnus, the Champions Chess Tour, and the chess improvement website Chessable. On December 16, 2022, the acquisition was officially closed. According to Dot Esports, the Play Magnus Group was unable to make a "sustainable profit" on anything but Chessable, and the merge left "no other realistic chess competitor" except the free, open-source Lichess.

Tournaments and events

Speed Chess Championships 
Chess.com has held the Speed Chess Championship annually since 2016, involving a single-elimination tournament featuring some of the world's best players. Nakamura has won five championships, while Carlsen has won two.

US Chess League 

The USCL was a nationwide national chess league in the United States between 2005 and 2016. Chess.com hosted the event in 2013.

PRO Chess League 

The PRO Chess League was the result of the US Chess League changing its name and format, with faster time controls and a focus on the flexibility of forming and managing teams.  Chess.com has hosted the PCL twice starting in 2017, having a regular and a summer series.

Titled Tuesdays 
Titled Tuesday is an 11-round Swiss-system 3+1 blitz chess tournament held on every Tuesday. Grandmaster participants include Hikaru Nakamura, Maxime Vachier-Lagrave, Alexander Grischuk, Dmitry Andreikin, Wesley So, and Fabiano Caruana. The first event was held on October 28, 2014, with a prize fund of $500 and was won by Baadur Jobava. The prize fund was gradually upgraded to $5000 per week. As of February 2023, GM Hikaru Nakamura has won a total of 50 tournament wins since October 2020 (becoming the first player to have ever achieved that milestone), followed by GMs Dmitry Andreikin and Jeffery Xiong with 11 each, Magnus Carlsen has won three of the events in which he has partaken as of 2017.

In June 2018, Chess.com held a special version of the tournament for which the winner would go on to participate in the Isle of Man International which had a prize fund of £144,000. Iranian GM Pouria Darini won the event.

Death Matches 
Death Matches were introduced in January 2012. They feature titled players taking part in a series of blitz games over a non-stop 3-hour period (5-minute, 3-minute and 1-minute, all with a one-second increment). There have been 38 deathmatches, participants including the grandmasters Hikaru Nakamura, Dmitry Andreikin, Maxime Vachier-Lagrave, Lê Quang Liêm, Wesley So, Fabiano Caruana, Judit Polgár and Nigel Short.

Chess.com Computer Chess Championship 
In November 2017, Chess.com held an open tournament, called the Chess.com Computer Chess Championship (CCCC, later CCC), with the ten strongest chess engines, with $2,500 in prize money. The top-two engines competed in a "Superfinale" tournament between the two finalists - Stockfish and Houdini. In the 20-game Superfinal, Stockfish won over Houdini with a score 10.5-9.5. Five games were decisive, with 15 ending in a draw.  Of the decisive games, three games were won by Stockfish, and two by Houdini.

In August 2018, the site announced that the Chess.com Computer Chess Championship has returned, this time as a non-stop tournament for chess engines.

PogChamps 

Chess.com has hosted PogChamps, an amateur online tournament featuring Twitch streamers, since 2020. The first PogChamps featured notable streamers including xQcOW, MoistCr1TiKaL, Ludwig Ahgren, and forsen. Notable new participants from PogChamps 2 included itsHafu and Hafþór Júlíus Björnsson. PogChamps 3, beginning in February 2021, debuted with a wider range of Internet personalities and celebrities, with new competitors including MrBeast, Neekolul, Myth, Pokimane, actor Rainn Wilson, and rapper Logic.

See also 
 List of Internet chess servers
 Top Chess Engine Championship

References

External links 
 
 ChessKid.com

2007 establishments in the United States
American social networking websites
Android (operating system) software
Chess databases
Chess in the United States
Companies based in Orange County, California
Internet chess servers
Internet properties established in 2007
Multilingual websites
Online video game services